Lenka Maňhalová (born October 28, 1974 in Liberec) is a retired female breaststroke and medley swimmer from the Czech Republic, who twice competed for her native country at the Olympic Games: in 1992 and 1996.

References
 sports-reference

1974 births
Living people
Czech female swimmers
Czech female breaststroke swimmers
Female medley swimmers
Swimmers at the 1992 Summer Olympics
Swimmers at the 1996 Summer Olympics
Olympic swimmers of Czechoslovakia
Olympic swimmers of the Czech Republic
Universiade medalists in swimming
Sportspeople from Liberec
Universiade silver medalists for the Czech Republic
Universiade bronze medalists for the Czech Republic
Medalists at the 1995 Summer Universiade
Medalists at the 1997 Summer Universiade